The AGO C.I was a First World War German pusher reconnaissance biplane that used a pod-and-boom configuration.

Development
The crew and pusher engine shared a central nacelle, and the twin booms carried the tail and the four-wheeled landing gear. The observer sat at the nose and was armed with a machine-gun.
 
A single example was fitted with floats for coastal patrol duties for the Imperial German Navy (designation C.I-W).

Operators 
 
 Luftstreitkrafte
 Kaiserliche Marine

Specifications

See also

References

Citations

Bibliography
 
 
 

C.I
AGO C.01
Military aircraft of World War I
Single-engined pusher aircraft
Aircraft first flown in 1915